Denmark–Serbia relations are foreign relations between Denmark and Serbia. Denmark has an embassy in Belgrade, and Serbia has an embassy in Copenhagen . In November 2010, speaker for the Danish parliament Thor Pedersen said that Denmark fully supported Serbia's efforts to join the EU, and that he was satisfied with Serbia's progress to that end. Both countries are members of the Organization for Security and Co-operation in Europe.
In March 2016 Head of Embassy of Denmark in Serbia, Morten Skovgaard Hansen, said that ”Denmark very openly supports the progress and reforms made by Serbia.”

Trade and agreements
In 2004, trade turnover between Denmark and Serbia amounted $37 million.

Carlsberg Srbija is a beer brewery in Serbia, owned by Danish Carlsberg Group since 2003. It is known by its signature brand Lav pivo.

On February 11, 2012, Denmark & Serbia signed a 9-million-euro agreement for the production of fruit. Also, according to a Danish ambassador, Serbia is already an important producer of berries.

A rising number of Danish companies such as Grundfos and Ergomade have set up production facilities in Serbia to take advantage of the cheap salaries and shutting down the more expensive Danish domestic production. The Danish Embassy actively supports this outsourcing on the terms "that it is good for job creation in Serbia".

Cooperation
Danish cooperation assists Serbia with biomass, biogas, wind energy and agro industry. Serbia is Denmark's biggest military cooperation partner.

The Embassy of Denmark, which since October 2015 has been directed by Head of Mission, Morten Skovgaard Hansen, also facilitated the visit of Serbian journalists to Denmark using public funds. Serbia ranks as having a "partly free" press.

Serbs in Denmark
Many Serbs are currently living in Denmark. Of the more famous ones can be mentioned Andrija Pavlovic and Aleksandar Jovanovic, both footballers at FC Copenhagen and Aarhus GF. Others cover the actors Dejan Curcic and Danica Curcic.

As the financial situation is worsening for regular citizens in Serbia, more and more Serbs are leaving their homeland in search of better possibilities, including in Denmark. Despite these declining terms of living, the head of the Danish mission in Serbia, Morten Skovgaard Hansen, concluded, in a Newsweek interview in March 2016, that "[t]he opening of the first chapters in December was an important step and a clear sign that Serbia is on the right track."

When Danish police in September 2016 encountered the body parts of a deceased gang-member, a Serbian national was charged with murder. He still awaits his trial.
Other Serbs under Danish police custody count Miodrag Jokic, Ranko Cesic and Radoslav Brdjanin, all of whom are serving sentences for war crimes committed during the breakup of Yugoslavia.

Radovan Karadzic, Republika Srpska leader, who is now serving a 40-year sentence issued by the ICTY in Hague, studied psychiatry in Denmark in 1970.

See also 
 Foreign relations of Denmark 
 Foreign relations of Serbia 
 Accession of Serbia to the European Union

References

External links
 Official Website of The Danish House in Serbia
 Danish-Serbian.dk 
 Danish Cooperation with Serbia
 Agreement between Denmark and Serbia on the facilitation of issuance of visas

 
Serbia
Bilateral relations of Serbia